Thomas Henderson (born 6 April 1949) is an English former professional footballer who played as a winger in the Football League for Bradford Park Avenue and York City and in non-League football for Tow Law Town, Bradford Park Avenue, Dartford, Weymouth and Bridport.

References

1949 births
Living people
Sportspeople from Consett
Footballers from County Durham
English footballers
Association football wingers
Tow Law Town F.C. players
Bradford (Park Avenue) A.F.C. players
York City F.C. players
Dartford F.C. players
Weymouth F.C. players
Bridport F.C. players
English Football League players
Southern Football League players